The A1136 is a road in North East Lincolnshire. It runs in a south-easterly direction from Healing to Grimsby town centre.

Route

The A1136 starts at Great Coates Interchange with the A180 road with a 'Double roundabout interchange'. Then it travels  to a roundabout with the B1210 road. The road heads straight on toward Great Coates passing through two mini roundabouts. Then heads towards Little Coates. The roads goes through the roundabout and continues heading towards Grimsby (Freshney Place to be exact). At the next roundabout the road forks right then after  it turns left. The road snakes its final  towards Grimsby town centre. The route ends at traffic lights with the A16 road.

Major junctions

Roads in Lincolnshire